Ginette Rossini (born 26 October 1939) is a Luxembourgian fencer. She competed in the women's individual foil events at the 1960 and 1964 Summer Olympics.

References

External links
 

1939 births
Living people
Luxembourgian female foil fencers
Olympic fencers of Luxembourg
Fencers at the 1960 Summer Olympics
Fencers at the 1964 Summer Olympics
Sportspeople from Esch-sur-Alzette